The Valedictory Stakes is a Canadian Thoroughbred horse race run annually in late November or early December at Woodbine Racetrack in Toronto, Ontario. Open to horses age three and older, the Grade III stakes is contested on a synthetic "all weather" dirt surface over a distance of  miles (12 furlongs).

History
Inaugurated as the Valedictory Handicap in 1952 at the Dufferin Park Racetrack, it was moved to the new Woodbine Racetrack for the 1956 running where it remained through 1960. From 1961 through 1993, the race was hosted by Greenwood Raceway; thereafter, the race returned to Woodine where it remains.

The Valedictory was originally run on dirt but in 2006 Woodbine switched to a synthetic "all weather" surface (originally Polytrack and then Tapeta starting in 2016). Always a longer distance race, over the years it has been contested at a variety of distances:
 1952:  miles
 1954–1955:  miles
 1956–2019:  miles
 2021-Present:  miles

The Valedictory was not run in 1953. The 2008 Valedictory was canceled due to extreme cold weather, while the 2020 edition was cancelled due to the COVID-19 pandemic.

The Valedictory was upgraded to grade III status in 2011. It is the final stakes event of the year at Woodbine racetrack, which is closed to Thoroughbred racing during the winter.

Records
Speed record:
 2:31.10 - Who's The Star, Wentru (2022 - Dead heat) (At current distance of  miles)

Most wins:
 2 - Bernfield (1957, 1958)
 2 - Whiteborough (1962, 1963)
 2 - Caesar B. Good (1967, 1968)
 2 - Knight's Turn (1979, 1980)
 2 - Pumpkin Rumble (2018, 2019)

Most wins by a jockey:
 4 - Hugo Dittfach (1959, 1966, 1967, 1975)
 4 - Patrick Husbands (2005, 2010, 2011, 2013)
 4 - Emma-Jayne Wilson (2006, 2012, 2014, 2016)
 4 - Eurico Rosa da Silva (2007, 2015, 2018, 2019)

Most wins by a trainer:
 5 - Lou Cavalaris, Jr. (1964, 1970, 1974, 1976, 1994)
 5 - Mark E. Casse (2003, 2010, 2017, 2021, 2022)

Most wins by an owner:
 7 - George R. Gardiner (1961, 1964, 1970, 1972, 1974, 1976, 1994)
 7 - Gardiner Farms (1961, 1964, 1970, 1972, 1974, 1976, 1994)

Winners

Other North American Marathon races
On dirt: 
 Brooklyn Handicap
 Fort Harrod Stakes
 Gallant Man Handicap
 Tokyo City Cup
 Las Vegas Marathon Stakes (formerly the Breeders' Cup Marathon)

On turf:
 San Juan Capistrano Invitational Handicap
 Carleton F. Burke Handicap
 Kentucky Cup Turf Stakes

See also
 List of Canadian flat horse races

References

 Race details and entrants for the 2008 Valedictory Stakes at Woodbine Racetrack
 The 2007 Valedictory Stakes at Woodbine Entertainment

Graded stakes races in Canada
Open long distance horse races
Horse races in Canada
Horse races established in 1952
Woodbine Racetrack
1952 establishments in Ontario